was a Japanese politician who served as governor of Hiroshima Prefecture from June 1903 to January 1904. He was also governor of Toyama Prefecture (1892–1896), Kagawa Prefecture (1896–1898) and Kumamoto Prefecture (1898–1903).

Governors of Hiroshima
1844 births
1910 deaths
Japanese Home Ministry government officials
Governors of Toyama Prefecture
Governors of Kagawa Prefecture
Governors of Kumamoto Prefecture